Westfield Marion (colloquially known as simply "Marion") is the largest mall in Adelaide, South Australia, located in Oaklands Park, serving greater Southern Adelaide. It contains approximately 342 stores, with anchor tenants including David Jones, Myer, Harris Scarfe, Target, Kmart, Big W, Woolworths, Coles, Event Cinemas, Aldi and Rebel Sport. The mall's Event Cinema complex is the Southern Hemisphere's largest cinema complex, featuring 26 screens. The mall houses all of Westfield's management in Adelaide, located in an 8-storey office block to the east of the centre, as well as services including; legal, child care, health and dental clinic. It also houses the head office for Fellas Gifts. The office tower is located at the original mall where the food court is facing Diagonal Road. The South Australia Aquatic and Leisure Centre is also a part of Westfield Marion.

History

Westfield Marion was built in 1968 on a large expanse of land bordered by Sturt, Diagonal and Morphett Roads, and has seen extensions in 1982, 1989, 1997 and 2016. The 1997 extension saw the centre expand to a floorspace of roughly 119,000 m2.

Westfield Marion achieved major Australian firsts upon redevelopment in 1997 as the first shopping centre to have all three department stores, as well as all three discount department stores.

Image gallery

References

External links
Westfield Marion

Westfield Group
Shopping centres in Adelaide
Shopping malls established in 1968